Nicholas Bruce Reid (30 July 1935 – 24 May 2020) was an Australian politician.

Born in Bendigo, Victoria, he served in the military in 1958 and then became a retailer. In 1976, he was elected to the Victorian Legislative Council as the Liberal member for Bendigo Province. He remained in the Legislative Council until 1988. In 1990, he was elected to the Australian House of Representatives as the Liberal member for the federal seat of Bendigo, defeating John Brumby.

After the Liberals lost the 1993 federal election he contested the Liberal leadership with John Howard and John Hewson, but received only one vote.

He held the seat of Bendigo until his retirement in 1998.

References

1935 births
2020 deaths
Members of the Australian House of Representatives for Bendigo
Members of the Australian House of Representatives
Members of the Victorian Legislative Council
Liberal Party of Australia members of the Parliament of Victoria
Liberal Party of Australia members of the Parliament of Australia
People from Bendigo
20th-century Australian politicians